Oleksandr Polovkov (born 4 October 1979, Sverdlovsk, Voroshylovhrad Oblast, Ukrainian SSR, Soviet Union) is a professional Ukrainian football defender who played for different clubs in the Ukrainian Premier League. He currently plays for FC Shakhtar Sverdlovsk.

On 8 August 2015 he played for LNR football team.

References

External links
 Official Website Profile
 Official FFU Website Profile

1979 births
Living people
People from Sverdlovsk
Ukrainian footballers
FC Shakhtar Sverdlovsk players
FC Stal Alchevsk players
FC Stal-2 Alchevsk players
FC Zorya Luhansk players
Navbahor Namangan players
Ukrainian expatriate footballers
Expatriate footballers in Uzbekistan
Association football defenders
Sportspeople from Luhansk Oblast